The Sima is a river in the municipality of Eidfjord in Hordaland, Norway.

The river continues west until its mouth at the head of the Simadal Fjord.

Together with the nearby Bjoreio River to the south, the Sima River has been developed for power production at the Sima Hydroelectric Power Station. The power station is located in the mountains below Kjeåsen on the north side of the Simadal Fjord.

References

Rivers of Vestland
Eidfjord